Saint-Maximin may refer to several places:
 Saint-Maximin, Gard, a commune in the Gard department in southern France
 Saint-Maximin, Isère, a commune in the Isère department in south-eastern France
 Saint-Maximin, Oise, a commune in the Oise department in northern France
 Saint-Maximin limestone, a building stone from the quarries of Saint-Maximin, Oise
 Saint-Maximin-la-Sainte-Baume, a commune in the Vardepartment in the Provence-Alpes-Côte d'Azur region in southeastern France
St. Maximin's Abbey, Trier, a Benedictine monastery in Trier in the Rhineland-Palatinate, Germany

People 
Allan Saint-Maximin, French footballer

See also 
Saint Maximin